Lycée Hélène Boucher may refer to:
 Lycée Funay - Hélène Boucher - Le Mans
 Lycée Hélène Boucher in Paris
 Lycée Hélène Boucher in Somain, Nord
 Lycée Hélène Boucher in Thionville
 Lycée Hélène Boucher in Toulouse
 Lycée Hélène Boucher in Tremblay-en-France (Paris area)
 Lycée Hélène Boucher in Venissieux